Podwale  is a village in the administrative district of Gmina Pacanów, within Busko County, Świętokrzyskie Voivodeship, in south-central Poland.

The village has a population of 140.

References

Villages in Busko County